Dai Kui (Chinese:戴逵) (~331–396) was an artist who lived in Eastern Jin in what is today China.

He was known as a poet, painter, and musician and was one of the first to establish the tradition of scientific amateur painting (wenrenhua). He was also the leading sculptor of his time, almost the only specimen in Chinese history of a gentleman who practiced this craft. He created bronze, lacquer statues, and carved wooden sculptures. Dai Kui painted mostly Buddhist and Daoist themes.

References

Jin dynasty (266–420) musicians
4th-century Chinese writers
4th-century Chinese artists
4th-century Chinese painters
4th-century Chinese musicians